Quantum bogodynamics (/kwon'tm boh`goh-di-nam'iks/) is a humorous parody of quantum mechanics, that describes the universe through interactions of fictional elementary particles, bogons (by analogy to the naming of real elementary particles, e.g. photons; but also from the English word bogus, meaning 'fake').

This theory assumes the existence of three basic phenomena:
 Bogon-emitting sources (such as politicians, used-car dealers, TV preachers, and teleshopping hosts)
 Bogon absorbers (or sinks) (taxpayers and computers),
 Bogosity potential fields.

The Jargon File Glossary describes the theory as follows:

The unit of bogosity is microLenat, proposed by David Jefferson, and was intended as an attack against computer scientist Doug Lenat. "Doug had failed the student on an important exam because the student gave only “AI is bogus” as his answer to the questions. The slur is generally considered unmerited, but it has become a running gag nevertheless. Some of Doug's friends argue that of course a microLenat is bogus, since it is only one millionth of a Lenat. Others have suggested that the unit should be redesignated after the grad student, as the microReid."

The term was formulated by hacker community, where bogons were used to describe units of "bogusness" or failure.

References 

Hacker culture
Computing culture